Valdimar Kristófersson (born 22 March 1970) is an Icelandic former professional footballer who played as a forward.

References

1970 births
Living people
Valdimar Kristofersson
Association football forwards
Valdimar Kristofersson
Valdimar Kristofersson
Valdimar Kristofersson
SV Wilhelmshaven players
Valdimar Kristofersson
Expatriate footballers in Belgium
Valdimar Kristofersson
Expatriate footballers in Germany
Valdimar Kristofersson